Carroll Avenue is a railway station in Michigan City, Indiana, serving the South Shore Line commuter rail line. For reasons of road access and parking, it, rather than the 11th Street station (also located in Michigan City but in the middle of a public street), is the city's primary commuter station for South Shore Line service.

Although Carroll Ave. is not the eastern terminus of the South Shore Line, most trains terminate or start at this station. The coach yard is located here, as well as NICTD's headquarters.

In June 2009, NICTD officials announced their intention to close this station, on an unspecified future date, as part of their plan to revamp the street-running section of the line on 10th and 11th streets within Michigan City. However, as of June, 2012, the line relocation is still in planning and the Carroll Avenue station remains active.

The station's address is 503 North Carroll Avenue, Michigan City, Indiana.

Bus connections
Michigan City Transit
 Route 3

References

External links
 
 South Shore Line - Stations
 Station from Roeske Avenue from Google Maps Street View

South Shore Line stations in Indiana
Michigan City, Indiana
Railway stations in LaPorte County, Indiana